The Raid on Saratoga was an attack by a French and Indian force on the settlement of Saratoga, New York on November 28, 1745, during King George's War.  Led by Paul Marin de la Malgue, the allied force of 600 burned the settlement, killing about 30 and taking 60 to 100 prisoners, in addition.

References
Peyser, Joseph L. Jacques Legardeur de Saint-Pierre: officer, gentleman, entrepreneur
Parkman, Francis. A half-century of conflict: France and England in North America, Volume 2

1745 in military history
Military history of Canada
Conflicts in 1745
Battles in New York (state)
Battles involving Great Britain
Battles involving France
Battles of the War of the Austrian Succession
Pre-statehood history of New York (state)
New France
1745 in the Province of New York
Military raids
Battles of King George's War